Brian Richard Baker (born April 30, 1985) is an American retired professional tennis player from Nashville, Tennessee.

Junior career
As a junior player, Baker won the 2002 Orange Bowl. In 2003, he reached the boys' singles final of the French Open after beating Marcos Baghdatis in the quarterfinals and Jo-Wilfried Tsonga in the semifinals. In the final, he lost to Stan Wawrinka.
Baker reached No. 2 in singles and No. 5 in doubles in the junior world rankings.

Pro career

Early career
Baker's biggest win of his fledgling career occurred in August 2005, when he scored an upset victory over ninth-seeded Gastón Gaudio in the 2005 US Open. The victory was Baker's first Grand Slam win. Baker originally played on the tour for only a short time, from 2002 through 2005, as well as participating in three autumn Challenger events in 2007. He won one Challenger event in singles (and three in doubles) during this time and reached a career-best singles ranking of world No. 172 on November 15, 2004. He was coached by Ricardo Acuña.

In 2007, he was sidelined for nearly six years after five surgeries—three on his hip, one on his elbow, and one sports hernia—and did not play on the tour again until 2011.

Return to professional tennis
While coaching tennis at Belmont University, Baker began to feel his body gradually improving and decided to try again to make it as a professional tennis player in the summer of 2011. He subsequently entered an ITF Futures tournament in Pittsburgh in July 2011 as an unranked qualifier, qualified, and won the tournament, all without dropping a set. In September, he entered the Canadian Futures 7 and reached the semifinals, again without dropping a set. He lost in a walkover to Jesse Levine. Two months later, in November 2011, Baker entered the 2011 Knoxville Challenger, and qualified for the tournament after straight-set victories over Jordan Cox, Tim Smyczek and Michael McClune. He went on to win his next four matches, before losing to Jesse Levine in the final.

2012

Baker won three Futures and Challenger tournaments early in 2012 before returning to the ATP Tour: USA F3 and F8, and Sarasota.

After winning the Savannah Challenger, beating Augustin Gensse in the final in April 2012, he was awarded a wild card for the 2012 French Open.  In response to this, Baker's good friend Amer Delić noted an inconvenient truth about the situation by tweeting, "Brian Baker... Same guy that USTA refused to give a WC for qualies of the clay court Future last summer..." The statement was in reference to the USA F17 tournament that Baker went on to win.

Shortly before the French Open, he qualified for the 2012 Open de Nice Côte d'Azur in May, beating Ilija Bozoljac, David Guez, and Alejandro González in the qualification rounds, all in straight sets. Baker then faced Sergey Stakhovsky in the first round, losing the first set before recovering to win the match. A straight sets victory against Gaël Monfils meant that Baker progressed to the quarterfinals of the tournament. Hard-fought wins over Mikhail Kukushkin and Nikolay Davydenko took Baker to his first ATP final on a 15-match winning streak going into the match. He ultimately lost to Nicolás Almagro, the repeat champion, in the final. After his surprising performance, he reached his highest singles ranking at No. 141.

Just two days after the final in Nice, Baker headed to Paris for the French Open. He beat Xavier Malisse in straight sets in the first round, before losing to Gilles Simon in the second round in five sets. Despite the defeat, Baker's appearance in the tournament was described as "one of the most remarkable comebacks of modern times."

Two weeks after the French Open, Baker qualified for the 2012 Wimbledon Championships after beating Radu Albot, Denis Gremelmayr, and Maxime Teixeira in the qualification rounds. He secured a straight-set victory over Rui Machado in his first-round match before dismissing Jarkko Nieminen, also in straight sets, to progress to the third round. In his third-round match, he beat Frenchman Benoît Paire in four sets. Baker bowed out of the competition in the fourth round, losing in straight sets to Philipp Kohlschreiber. On his performance at Wimbledon, Baker stated - "It's been an unbelievable run. I don't know if I put an expectation like I need to get to this round or not. But I don't know if starting first round qualifiers I would have thought I would have got to the fourth round of Wimbledon".

After starting the North American hard-court season with a string of four first-round losses to lower-ranked players, Baker pulled off another remarkable upset, gaining revenge by beating world No. 17 (and recent Wimbledon quarterfinalist) Philipp Kohlschreiber in the first round of the Cincinnati Masters. He subsequently lost to Australian Bernard Tomic in the second round. At the 2012 US Open, he matched his best US Open and Grand Slam performance from before his injuries, reaching the second round. He defeated Jan Hájek before falling to eighth seed Janko Tipsarević.

During the indoor hard-court season, Baker qualified (as the top qualifying seed) for the ATP 500 tournament Beijing, losing in the first round to Kevin Anderson. He then qualified for the Shanghai Masters, losing to 11th seed Richard Gasquet in the opening round. After these consecutive first-round losses, Baker pulled off a remarkable comeback by winning against Radek Štěpánek in Basel, after being a set and a double-break down. Baker lost in the second round to eventual champion Juan Martín del Potro.

He ended 2012 ranked world No. 61, after reaching a career-high ranking of world No. 52 in October.

2013
In the Heineken Open in Auckland, Baker upset fifth seed (and recent Paris Masters finalist) Jerzy Janowicz in the first round. He converted 2 out of 17 break points and finally won on his eighth match point.

In the second round of the Australian Open, Baker led 20th seed Sam Querrey 7–6(2), 1–1 before a knee injury forced him to retire. This was later diagnosed as a torn meniscus, which put Baker off the tour for about four months.

Baker made his return in Aptos. losing to Guido Pella. He then lost to Grigor Dimitrov in the second round of the Cincinnati Masters. At the U.S Open. he was defeated by Lleyton Hewitt in the first round.

He ended 2013 ranked world No. 359.

2014
Baker withdrew from the 2014 Australian Open, citing a knee injury.

2015–2017
He was granted a wild card into the main draw of the 2016 Australian Open after a nearly three-year injury layoff.

In August 2016, he lost in the Round of 16 of the Tennis at the 2016 Summer Olympics – Men's doubles partnering with Rajeev Ram. They faced off against the Austrian team of Oliver Marach and Alexander Peya. 
 
In February 2017, he won his maiden ATP Tour title at the Memphis Open in doubles partnering Nikola Mektić. They faced off against compatriots Ryan Harrison and Steve Johnson in the final. He won his second doubles title in Budapest in April, again partnering with Mektić.

2018
Baker underwent his 14th major surgery on 21 December 2018 (back), delaying his comeback.

Personal life
Baker was as an assistant coach for the Belmont University men's tennis program for four years. He studied toward business and finance degrees at the university.

ATP career finals

Singles: 1 (1 runner-up)

Doubles: 2 (2 titles)

ATP Challenger Tour and ITF Futures finals

Singles: 10 (6 titles, 4 runner-ups)

Doubles: 15 (11 titles, 4 runner-ups)

Junior Grand Slam finals

Singles: 1 (1 runner-up)

Doubles: 2 (2 runner-ups)

Performance timelines

Singles

Doubles

Wins over top-10 players

References

External links
 
 
 
 Brian Baker's Athletic DNA Profile
 Belmont Men's Tennis Profile
 NY Times Article detailing Brian Baker's career

1985 births
Living people
American male tennis players
Belmont University
Sportspeople from Nashville, Tennessee
Tennis people from Tennessee
Olympic tennis players of the United States
Tennis players at the 2016 Summer Olympics